The Rural Institute of Higher Studies, Bhograi is a Government Aided institution. It offers both Intermediate (+2) & Graduation (+3) courses in Arts, Science & Commerce. It is established in 1980 with only intermediate education by the funding of local people & party leaders under CHSE, Odisha. Subsequently it added +3 courses. In 2006 it is approved by UGC & affiliated to Fakir Mohan University.

Courses offered 
 +2 in Arts
 +2 in Commerce
 +2 in Science
 +3 in Arts (Oriya, History, English, Education, Pol. Science & Economics Hons.)
 +3 in Commerece ( Accountancy Hons Only )
 +3 in Science (Chemistry, Physics, Mathematics, Botany & Zoology)

Admission procedure 
The admission process of both +2 & +3 is done through e-admission administrated by CHSE, Odisha

In that process students have to fill application on-line with uploading of required documents, the web automated software for admission chooses the right college for the student/candidate with reference to the student's marks, reservation category etc.

See also
CHSE

References

External links 
 

Department of Higher Education, Odisha
Education in Balasore district
Educational institutions established in 1980
1980 establishments in Orissa